A Silhouette in Splinters is the third full-length album by San Franciscan black metal band Leviathan. Unlike previous releases (which banked on distorted guitars and speedy tempos), this is completely dark ambient.

Limited to 500 copies on red vinyl.

In 2008, a cd version was released by Moribund Cult.

Track listing

Leviathan (musical project) albums
2005 albums
Profound Lore Records albums